Proto-fascism refers to the direct predecessor ideologies and cultural movements that influenced and formed the basis of fascism. A prominent proto-fascist figure is Gabriele D'Annunzio, the Italian nationalist whose politics influenced Benito Mussolini and Italian Fascism. Proto-fascist political movements include the Italian Nationalist Association (Associazione Nazionalista Italiana, ANI), the German National Association of Commercial Employees (Deutschnationaler Handlungsgehilfen-Verband, DHV) and the German National People's Party (Deutschnationale Volkspartei, DNVP).

Other people who have been labeled proto-fascist because they shared an ideological basis with fascism include:
 Thomas Carlyle (1795–1881)
 Georges Ernest Boulanger (1837–1891)
 George Fitzhugh (1806–1881)
 John Ruskin (1819–1900)
 Charles Maurras (1868–1952)
 Ion Dragoumis (1878–1920)
 Patrick Pearse (1879–1916)
 Edgar Julius Jung (1894–1934)
 D. H. Lawrence (1885–1930). The English philosopher Bertrand Russell characterized Lawrence as a "proto-German fascist". This characterization is useful as a demarcation point between Fascism and proto-fascism. The former has totalitarian uniformity as its paradigm, but Russell is referring to Lawrence as a "nonconformist prophet" struggling with individual alienation, looking to the shared identity of ancestral blood and soil for reconnection i.e. an evolution of the German 19th-century Völkisch movement, an ideology that was adopted by the National Socialist movement. 
Giuseppe Mazzini (1805–1872). The famous Genoese patriot strongly influenced Italian fascism, especially in its early years. In particular, fascism inherited from Mazzini the fervent irredentism, the concept of class collaboration, the pedagogical vocation and the spirit of solidarity. Mussolini himself was a great Mazzini admirer, and many fascist exponents were Mazzinian such as Italo Balbo, Giovanni Gentile, Giuseppe Bottai and Dino Grandi.
Francesco Crispi (1818–1901). The known Sicilian statesman was admired by the dictator Mussolini and considered by many scholars as a precursor of Italian fascist regime, due to his authoritarian policies, the nationalist character, his strongman reputation and the aggressive colonial policy implemented during his government.

References

Sources
 

Fascism
Politics
Proto-fascists
Racism